This is a list of gliders/sailplanes of the world, (this reference lists all gliders with references, where available) 
Note: Any aircraft can glide for a short time, but gliders are designed to glide for longer.

This list is of gliders/sailplanes that have limited information available.

Miscellaneous 
 Aéroplaneur 1911 glider
 ANB (glider) (Cyrillic:АНБ)
 Aquilla (glider)
 AV 222/H14
 Bacerka
 Bahr (glider)
 Bauart
 Cancarevic
 Caucase du Nord (North Caucasus)
 Chelm School Glider (Latvia)
 Cirulitis (glider)
 Cumulus 5 – Japan
 Daugaviete
 Delfin (glider)
 Delfin M-2
 Delfin M-3
 Delta 1
 Dream (glider)
 Dream (glider)
 Drückspatz II
 Dubno School Glider
 Dzerve
 Elytre
 Erglis
 Gamajun (glider)
 GK 1911 glider
 Grif (glider)
 Gulbene II – Latvia
 Gulbis (glider)
 Hamborger Jung
 Illerfalke
 ILZS
 Jamin 1932 glider
 Janika (glider)
 Jar Ptiza
 Jastreb 54
 Jastreb bis
 Jenni 1931 glider
 Jerav (glider) – Bulgaria (Kranich II copy)
 Joey (glider)
 Jupp-Pitter
 Kaija (glider)
 KANJA Ultra Light Glider
 Kijushu 5
 Kijushu 7
 KL biplane glider
 Koctebel (glider)
 Kokot Pisece
 Kristal (avion)
 Lāčplēsis (glider)
 Lányi Az Ket biplán
 Latvija (glider)
 Le Grolinet
 Lenta (glider)
 Lotnia Feyrala
 Ly Thermikas
 Maikapars
 Mara (glider)
 Mattley Primary
 Meinigen
 Mintava
 Młody Lotnik Glider
 Monk Pegasus
 Mouisset AP-1
 Mulhousia
 Mulliners Aeroplane
 Nameisis (glider)
 Niemcy Bräutigam
 Nippon Tombo
 Okarmusa 1
 Okarmusa 2
 Parsla
 PCF (glider)
 Perth Glider 2
 Philips MK-I
 Philips MK-II
 PIP (glider)
 Praha 1922 glider - Skupina Konstrktér
 Prodam III Hadi
 Prva petoletka Roda
 PW-5 (glider) – 1922
 Renaut Primary
 Robert Aéroplane
 Rowley R-100
 Russell Whisper 2004
 Sailer Liegnitz
 Salka (glider)
 Selija (glider)
 Seshayes P-1
 Sesquiplane Glider
 Sharapov AN Brawler Kudeyar  "Desperado"
 Skaubitis
 Skauts
 Skif (glider)
 Skrunda I
 Sloka (glider)
 SM-206
 SM-5 (glider)
 Smith Norbet 1923
 Smolenets (glider) – (Смоленец)
 Sova (motor-glider)
 Staburags (glider)
 STC-CG 1931
 Streifeneder Albatros I
 Suarez 1895 glider
 SUE-1
 Sup 1922 glider
 Sutton Airedale
 SZ-10 Horak

References

miscellaneous